
Gmina Wydminy is a rural gmina (administrative district) in Giżycko County, Warmian-Masurian Voivodeship, in northern Poland.

Villages
Gmina Wydminy contains the villages and settlements of Berkowo, Biała Giżycka, Cybulki, Czarnówka, Dudka, Ernstowo, Franciszkowo, Gajrowskie, Gawliki Małe, Gawliki Wielkie, Gębałki, Grądzkie, Grodkowo, Hejbuty, Kowalewskie, Krzywe, Łękuk Mały, Malinka, Mazuchówka, Okrągłe, Orłowo, Pamry, Pańska Wola, Pietrasze, Radzie, Ranty, Róg Orłowski, Rostki, Rydze, Siedliska, Siejba, Siemionki, Skomack Mały, Sucholaski, Szczepanki, Szczybały Orłowskie, Talki, Wężówka, Wólka Cybulska, Wydminy and Zelki.

Neighbouring gminas
Gmina Wydminy is bordered by the gminas of Giżycko, Kruklanki, Miłki, Orzysz, Stare Juchy and Świętajno.

References
Polish official population figures 2006

Wydminy
Giżycko County